Kokoda Rural LLG is a local-level government (LLG) of Oro Province, Papua New Guinea.

Wards
01. Asimba
02. Kovelo
04. Saga
06. Iora Lss Blocks
07. Kebara
08. Abuari
09. Alola
10. Waju
11. Hangiri
12. Ambene
13. Ilimo
14. Hamara
15. Ajeka
16. Evasusu
17. Asisi
18. Sairope
19. Putembo
20. Asafa
21. Wora
22. Emo
23. Awoma
24. Kovio
81. Kokoda Urban
82. Mamba Urban

References

Local-level governments of Oro Province